Three Boys, One Girl (French: Trois garçons, une fille) is a 1948 French comedy drama film directed by Maurice Labro and starring Jean Marchat, Gaby Morlay and Suzy Carrier.

The film's sets were designed by the art directors Lucien Carré and Raymond Nègre.

Cast
 Jean Marchat as Georges Dourville  
 Gaby Morlay as Hélène Dourville  
 Suzy Carrier as Christine Dourville  
 Bernard La Jarrige as Michel Dourville  
 François Patrice as Gilbert Dourville  
 Maurice Favières as Bernard Dourville  
 Luce Fabiole as Anna  
 Gaby Bruyère as ami de Gilbert 
 Marcel Loche as Huissier  
 Nelly Wick as Dame  
 Harry-Max
 Paul Clérouc 
 Jacqueline Dor

References

Bibliography 
 Goble, Alan. The Complete Index to Literary Sources in Film. Walter de Gruyter, 1999.

External links 
 

1948 films
1948 comedy-drama films
French comedy-drama films
1940s French-language films
Films directed by Maurice Labro
French black-and-white films
1940s French films